Medicosma elliptica, commonly known as Bulburin medicosma, is a species of shrub or small tree in the family Rutaceae and is endemic to a restricted area of Queensland. It has elliptical leaves and white flowers borne singly or in small groups in leaf axils.

Description
The leaves are glabrous and have many conspicuous oil dots.

Taxonomy
Medicosma elliptica was first formally described in 1985 by Thomas Gordon Hartley in the Australian Journal of Botany from specimens collected in the Bulburin State Forest in 1978.

Distribution and habitat
Bulburin medicosma grows in mountainous terrain on steep, rocky hillsides in vine forest with hoop pine (Araucaria cunninghamii), brush box (Lophostemon confertus) and Moreton Bay fig (Ficus macrophylla), in an area previously logged for hoop pine. It is found in the Many Peaks and Dawes Ranges in east-central Queensland.

Conservation status
This species is classified as "vulnerable" under the Australian Government Environment Protection and Biodiversity Conservation Act 1999 and the Queensland Government Nature Conservation Act 1992. The main threats to the species are inappropriate fire regimes and invasion by the exotic weed Lantana camara, partly caused by disturbance caused by earlier logging of hoop pine.

References

elliptica
Sapindales of Australia
Flora of Queensland
Plants described in 1985
Taxa named by Thomas Gordon Hartley